Matthew Clay (born 27 October 1982) is an English swimmer best known for winning gold in the men's 50 m backstroke at the 2006 Commonwealth Games in Melbourne.

See also
List of Commonwealth Games medallists in swimming (men)

References

Living people
1982 births
English male swimmers
Swimmers at the 2006 Commonwealth Games
Commonwealth Games gold medallists for England
People educated at Queen's College, Taunton
European Aquatics Championships medalists in swimming
Commonwealth Games medallists in swimming
Universiade medalists in swimming
Universiade bronze medalists for Great Britain
Medalists at the 2007 Summer Universiade
Medallists at the 2006 Commonwealth Games